Parasyphraea is a genus of flea beetles belonging to the family Chrysomelidae. They are found in South America (Colombia, Venezuela, Brazil, Peru, Bolivia).

Species
 Parasyphraea alaida Bechyné & Bechyné, 1961
 Parasyphraea attenuaticornis Bechyné & Bechyné, 1961
 Parasyphraea bicostulata Bechyné & Bechyné, 1961
 Parasyphraea biolena Bechyné, 1967
 Parasyphraea bordoni Bechyné & Bechyné, 1964
 Parasyphraea citrirubra Bechyné & Bechyné, 1964
 Parasyphraea desvia Bechyné & Bechyné, 1964
 Parasyphraea egleri Bechyné & Bechyné, 1965
 Parasyphraea foveifrons (Bechyné, 1956)
 Parasyphraea geniculata Bechyné & Bechyné, 1964
 Parasyphraea granulosa Bechyné & Bechyné, 1961
 Parasyphraea hetaera Bechyné, 1967
 Parasyphraea homolimbia Bechyné, 1959
 Parasyphraea irupana Bechyné, 1959
 Parasyphraea isolda Bechyné, 1959
 Parasyphraea liodina (Bechyné, 1958)
 Parasyphraea llama (Bechyné, 1956)
 Parasyphraea marina Bechyné, 1967
 Parasyphraea mesomera Bechyné & Bechyné, 1964
 Parasyphraea nigriceps (Boheman, 1859)
 Parasyphraea palissandra Bechyné, 1959
 Parasyphraea pantana Bechyné, 1967
 Parasyphraea paraiba (Bechyné, 1958)
 Parasyphraea pleurica Bechyné & Bechyné, 1961
 Parasyphraea retroversa Bechyné & Bechyné, 1961
 Parasyphraea sampaia Bechyné & Bechyné, 1961
 Parasyphraea selecta Bechyné & Bechyné, 1961
 Parasyphraea sinuatella Bechyné & Bechyné, 1961
 Parasyphraea solitaria Bechyné, 1967
 Parasyphraea sulcifera Bechyné & Bechyné, 1961
 Parasyphraea ultrasimilis (Bechyné, 1954)
 Parasyphraea xantholimbia Bechyné, 1959
 Parasyphraea yeda Bechyné & Bechyné, 1961

References

Alticini
Chrysomelidae genera